Deriringa is a Parish of Ularara County in north west New South Wales. The main  economic activity of the parish is agriculture, with the Ardoo and the Salisbury Downs Station . the parish is at 30°06′37″S 143°34′02″E.

Climate 
The climate is semi-arid, featuring low rainfall, very hot summer temperatures and cool nights in winter. The parish has a Köppen climate classification of BWh (Hot desert). A minimum temperature of -3.9 °C was recorded in nearby Wanaaring in July 1997.

References

Parishes of Ularara County
Far West (New South Wales)